Eva Olsson (born 2 September 1951) is a Swedish former cross-country skier. She competed at the 1972, 1976 and the 1980 Winter Olympics. She was also the flag bearer for Sweden at the 1980 Winter Olympics.

Cross-country skiing results
All results are sourced from the International Ski Federation (FIS).

Olympic Games

World Championships

References

External links
 

1951 births
Living people
Swedish female cross-country skiers
Olympic cross-country skiers of Sweden
Cross-country skiers at the 1972 Winter Olympics
Cross-country skiers at the 1976 Winter Olympics
Cross-country skiers at the 1980 Winter Olympics
Sportspeople from Stockholm